Pectinimura singularis is a moth in the family Lecithoceridae. It is found in Papua New Guinea.

The length of the forewings is 6–8.5 mm. The forewings are pale greyish, with uniformly scattered blackish scales.

Etymology
The species name refers to the single spinelike cornutus and is derived from Latin singulus (meaning single, one).

References

Moths described in 2011
singularis